Cyligramma magus is a moth of the family Noctuidae first described by Félix Édouard Guérin-Méneville in 1844. It is found in most of Sub-Saharan Africa.

References

Catocalinae
Lepidoptera of the Democratic Republic of the Congo
Lepidoptera of West Africa
Lepidoptera of Uganda
Lepidoptera of Angola
Lepidoptera of Ethiopia
Lepidoptera of Malawi
Lepidoptera of Tanzania
Lepidoptera of Zimbabwe
Moths of Madagascar
Moths of Sub-Saharan Africa
Owlet moths of Africa